Bayram Kandi (also Romanized as Bāyrām Kandī; also known as Bahrām Kandī, Bairamkand, and Bayramkend) is a village in Qarah Su Rural District, in the Central District of Khoy County, West Azerbaijan Province, Iran. At the 2006 census, its population was 209, in 50 families.

References 

Populated places in Khoy County